Middle Ridge is a residential locality of Toowoomba in the Toowoomba Region, Queensland, Australia.

Geography

History

Middle Ridge was named in the 1860s, as the area between East and West Creeks where the teamsters who camped at Toowoomba turned their teams loose to graze.

The Shire of Middle Ridge, a local government area, existed from 1880 to 1917. The shire's centre was at the intersection of Stenner and Hume Streets now the north-western corner of the locality of Middle Ridge where there was the shire hall, the school and a church.

Between 1958 and 1961 three motor racing events took place at Middle Ridge, to coincide with the 'Carnival of the Flowers' in September. A rectangular circuit using Stenner Street-Mackenzie Street-Alderley Street-Rowbotham Street was run in an anti-clockwise direction. There have been several reasons given why racing stopped after 1961 - local farmers claimed that the races stopped their chickens laying eggs; the carnival organisers believed that loud racing engines were incompatible with flowers; or that the races were pulling spectators away from other Carnival events.

Middle Ridge State School opened on 27 May 1884.

Education 
Middle Ridge State School is a government primary (Prep-6) school for boys and girls at 203 Spring Street. In 2017, the school had an enrolment of 827 students with 65 teachers (53 full-time equivalent) and 33 non-teaching staff (20 full-time equivalent). It includes a special education program.

Community groups 
Several sporting facilities are also located in Middle Ridge: the Echo Valley Motor Sport Complex (home to the Toowoomba Auto Club and Toowoomba Motocross Club), the Valleys rugby league club, and Toowoomba Golf Club.

The Middle Ridge branch of the Queensland Country Women's Association meets at 95 Preston-Boundary Road, Preston.

Heritage listings 

Middle Ridge is home to the heritage-listed Gabbinbar homestead 344-376 Ramsay Street.

References

External links 
 

Suburbs of Toowoomba
Localities in Queensland